Caribou is an unincorporated community in Caribou Township, Kittson County, Minnesota, United States.

The community is located northeast of Lancaster, along Kittson County Road 4, near its junction with Kittson County Road 53.

Nearby places include Lancaster, Lake Bronson, Greenbush, and Badger.

History
The community of Caribou was settled in the early 1900s by Ukrainian immigrants.

St. Nicholas Orthodox Church in Caribou is listed on the National Register of Historic Places.

References

Unincorporated communities in Minnesota
Unincorporated communities in Kittson County, Minnesota